The  was an electric multiple unit (EMU) train type operated in Japan by the private railway operator Hankyu Railway from 1960 until March 2015.

Formations

 The "Mc" and "Mo" cars were each fitted with two lozenge-type pantographs.

Interior
Passenger accommodation consisted of longitudinal bench seating throughout.

History
Construction of the trains began in 1960. The Hankyu 2300 series was the recipient of the inaugural Laurel Prize presented by the Japan Railfan Club in 1961. The final set in service operated until 20 March 2015.

Preserved examples
 2301 + 2352: Shōjaku Depot, Osaka
 2311 cab end: Privately preserved in Sanda, Hyōgo.

References

Further reading
 

Electric multiple units of Japan
2300 series
Train-related introductions in 1960
600 V DC multiple units
1500 V DC multiple units of Japan
Naniwa Koki rolling stock